A bargaining unit, in labor relations, is a group of employees with a clear and identifiable community of interests who is (under US law) represented by a single labor union in collective bargaining and other dealings with management. Examples are non-management professors, law enforcement professionals, blue-collar workers, and clerical and administrative employees.  Geographic location and the number of facilities included in bargaining units may be issues during representation cases.

The size of a company does not relate to the size of a bargaining unit. Bargaining units must consist of at least three employees, and must have the support of a majority of employees in the bargaining unit. However, the bargaining unit can be a small portion of a large company if no other employees are members of a union.  

Labor relations
Trade unions
Industrial agreements